Dead Men Don't Make Shadows, aka Stranger That Kneels Beside the Shadow of a Corpse (in original Italian: Inginocchiati straniero... I cadaveri non fanno ombra!) is a 1970 Spaghetti Western directed by Demofilo Fidani.

Story
A bounty hunter finds himself caught between an outlaw and an evil mine owner.

Cast
Jack Betts as Hunt Powers – Lazar Peacock/Sabata
Franco Borelli as Chet Davis – Blonde/Stranger
Gordon Mitchell – Roger Murdock
Ettore Manni – Barrett/Billy Ring
Benito Pacifico as Dennis Colt – Medina
Simonetta Vitelli as Simone Blondell – Maya
Custer Gail – Medina Henchman
Mila Vitelli Valenza as Mary Ross – Jole
Pietro Fumelli - Ted Stanley
Attilio Dottesio as Dean Reese – Sanchez
Manlio Salvatori - The 1st Sheriff
Eugenio Galadini - Tom, The Storekeeper
Mario Capuccio - The Mine Worker
Giglio Gigli - Medina Henchman
Aristide Massaccesi as Arizona Massachusetts - Cinematographer

Releases
Wild East released a limited edition R0 NTSC DVD double feature with One Damned Day at Dawn...Django Meets Sartana!.

External links

References

1970 films
1970s Italian-language films
Spaghetti Western films
1970 Western (genre) films
Films scored by Lallo Gori
1970s Italian films